Gevorg Melik-Karagyozyan was an Armenian politician who served as Minister of Enlightenment (Public Education and Art) of the First Republic of Armenia from 1918 to 1919.

References 

Armenian politicians
People of the First Republic of Armenia